Dakota Moon is the self-titled debut album by American R&B group Dakota Moon, released on April 14, 1998 on Elektra Records.

"A Promise I Make" and "Another Day Goes By" are Top 20 hits on the Hot Adult Contemporary Tracks, peaking at No. 11 and No. 19 respectively.

Track listing

Charts

References

1998 debut albums
Dakota Moon albums
Elektra Records albums